The Morin transition (also known as a spin-flop transition) is a magnetic phase transition in α-Fe2O3 hematite where the antiferromagnetic ordering is reorganized from being aligned perpendicular to the c-axis to be aligned parallel to the c-axis below TM.

TM = 260K for Fe3+ in α-Fe2O3.

A change in magnetic properties takes place at the Morin transition temperature.

See also

References

 

Magnetic ordering
Phase transitions